The Progressive Architecture Awards (P/A Awards) annually recognise risk-taking practitioners and seek to promote progress in the field of architecture.

History
The editors of Progressive Architecture magazine hosted the first Progressive Architecture Award jury in 1954, with a jury of Victor Gruen, George Howe, Eero Saarinen, and Fred Severud.  
Progressive Architecture magazine ended the awards in 1987.  

In 1997, Hanley Wood, owner of Architecture magazine, restarted Progressive Architecture Awards.  In 2007, Architecture folded, and the awards were inherited by a new publication, titled ARCHITECT.

PA Design Awards
Third
 2021 Teweles & Brandeis Granary — LA DALLMAN
 2020 Richard Gilder Center for Science, Education, and Innovation — Studio Gang
 2019 Ring of Hope — Paul Preissner Architects
 2013 Arctic Food Network — Lateral Office
 2013 Beukenhof Crematorium and Auditorium — Asymptote Architecture 
 2013 Floatyard — Perkins+Will
 2013 Rock Chapel Marine — Landing Studio
 2013 The Farm: Gaming Strategies for Empowering Marginalized Youth — Steven Mankouche and Matthew Schulte
 2013 Calexico West Land Port of Entry — Perkins+Will 
 2013 Dortoir Familial — NADAAA
 2013 Kimball Art Center — BIG
 2013 Modulo Prep Library — CRO 
 2013 Studio Smart Material House — by Barkow Leibinger
 2007 Hybrid Urban Sutures — Aziza Chaouni
 2007 Calgary Centre for Global Community — Marc Boutin Architect
 2007 Pittman Dowell Residence — Michael Maltzen Architecture
 2007 Villa Moda, New Kuwait Sports Shooting Club — Office dA
 2007 Bahá'í Mother Temple for South America — Hariri Pontarini Architects
 2007 Bab Tebbaneh School for Working Children and for Women — Hashim Sarkis
 2007 Campus d'Espoir (campus of hope) — Studio Luz Architects
 2007 Good Shepherd Ecumenical Retirement Community — the University of Arkansas Community Design Center

Second
 2003  Dalki Theme Park and Shop (Dalki, South Korea) — Slade Architecture
1999  Von Erlach Residence (Shelter Island, New York) — Cho Slade Architecture
1999  Large piazza located on a landfill in the Adige River in Verona, Italy — Michael Gabellini
1991  Vermont & Santa Monica MTA Transit Station (Los Angeles, California) — Mehrdad Yasdani

First
1985  Wexner Center for the Arts (Columbus, OH) — Peter Eisenman
1983 Citation for NSF-funded Research on Lightweight Structures — Zann Gill
1980 Citation for Frehley House --George Ranalli
1973 Queens Village (Philadelphia) Louis Sauer 
1969  Head House Square East (Society Hill, Philadelphia) — Louis Sauer
1966 Redevelopment of City Center Plan (Oakland, California) — William Liskamm and Rai Okamoto
1965  Pastorius Mews (Germantown, Philadelphia) — Louis Sauer  
1964  James Hamilton House (New Hope, Pennsylvania) — Louis Sauer 
1964  11th and Waverly Town Houses (Philadelphia) — Louis Sauer
1963  Richard Cripps House (Lambertville, New Jersey) — Louis Sauer

Progressive Architecture magazine
In June 1920, Pencil Points was founded. 
It was renamed to New Pencil Points.
In 1945, it was renamed to Progressive Architecture.

In 1996, the Progressive Architecture magazine name and subscriber list was sold to BPI Communications, by Penton Publishing.

References

External links
2008 Progressive Architecture Awards
2010 Progressive Architecture Awards

Architecture awards